SallyAnn Salsano (born c. 1974) is an American television producer. Her company, 495 Productions, has produced several television reality shows for MTV and syndication, including Jersey Shore  and The Real.

Biography
Salsano was raised in Farmingdale, New York, on Long Island, and graduated from Farmingdale High School in 1992. She named her company for Interstate 495 on Long Island.  In 1996 she was a finalist for MTV's The Real World: Miami.

Salsano attended the University of Missouri. She started her career as an intern for TV and radio personalities Howard Stern and Sally Jessy Raphael, then worked in various producer capacities on The Bachelor, The Bachelorette, Trista & Ryan's Wedding, Extreme Makeover: Wedding Edition, and Surprise Weddings I & II.  In 2006 she launched 495 Productions, which is based in Burbank, California. It produces several television reality shows for MTV, including Jersey Shore.

As Salsano has described herself, "I'm an Italian girl from Long Island, my dad worked in sanitation, both of my parents drive Cadillacs, my dad wears a diamond-encrusted New York Yankees symbol around his neck. It doesn't get more guido than in my house." She said that she spent several summers at the New Jersey shore growing up, saying, "I was Snooki. I woke up and was like, 'Oh, that was a crazy night.' That's what you do."

Productions

All Star Shore (2022-present)
Buckhead Shore (2022-present)
Joe Millionaire: For Richer or Poorer (2022)
Paradise Hotel (2019)
Jersey Shore Family Vacation (2018–present)
Winter Break: Hunter Mountain (2018)
Floribama Shore (2017–2021)
Martha & Snoop's Potluck Dinner Party (2016–2020)
Blue Collar Millionaires (2015)
Party Down South 2 (2014-2015)
Party Down South (2014-2016)
Jerks with Cameras (2014)
Fangasm (2014)
Tattoos After Dark (2014)
The Real (2013–2016)
Snooki & JWoww (2012–2015)
Tattoo Nightmares (2012–2015)
Tanisha Gets Married (2012)
Mama Drama (2012)
Friendzone (2011–2014)
Repo Games (2011–2012)
The Nail Files (2011–2012)
Love Handles: Couples in Crisis (2011)
Jersey Shore (2009–2012)
My Big Friggin' Wedding (2010)
Tool Academy (2009–2010)
Disaster Date (2009–2011)
More to Love (2009)
HGTV Design Star (2006–2009)
The Antonio Project (2009) (which became The Antonio Treatment under a different producer)
Dance Your Ass Off (2009)
HGTV $250,000 Challenge (2009)
A Double Shot at Love (2008–2009)
Nashville Star (2008)
A Shot at Love II with Tila Tequila (2008)
That's Amore! (TV series) (2008)
A Shot at Love with Tila Tequila (2007)
The Big Party Plan Off (2007–2008)
More Amore (2008)
Making of an HGTV Design Star (2006)
Secret Life of a Soccer Mom (2006)

References

External links

Official Website

1974 births
Television producers from New York (state)
American women television producers
People from Farmingdale, New York
American people of Italian descent
University of Missouri alumni
Living people
Farmingdale High School alumni
21st-century American women